The Liga Pro Bet593, simply known as the Liga Pro, or the Serie A, is a professional football league in Ecuador. At the top of the Ecuadorian football league system, it is the country's premier football competition. Contested by sixteen clubs, it operates a system of promotion and relegation with the Serie B, the lower level of the Primera Categoría. The season runs from February to December and is usually contested in multiple stages.

While initially not a league, the Serie A has its roots in the national championship between the top teams of Ecuador's two regional leagues. For the first nine editions, teams from Guayaquil and Quito qualified to the competition through their professional regional leagues. It abandoned the qualification format to form a proper league in 1967. Since the first edition in 1957, the tournament has been held annually (except 1958 and 1959); the 2005 season had two champions. It was ranked by IFFHS as the 11th strongest football league in the world for 2022, and the 4th strongest league in South America.

Eleven clubs have been crowned Ecuadorian champions, but four teams have a combined total of 54 championships. The most successful club is Barcelona with sixteen titles. Aucas are the defending champions.

Format
The format for the Serie A national championship changes consistently. The most common format is a two-stage tournament, in which teams qualify to a mini-league to determine the champion. The current format was introduced for the 2010 season and consists of three stages. The First and Second Stages each follow the double round-robin format. The winners of each stage play against each other in the Third Stage for the championship. A third-place match also takes place in the Third Stage between the next two-best teams in the aggregate table. If the same team wins both the First and Second Stage, they are automatically the champion. In this case, the second and third best teams in the aggregate table play against each other for runner-up.

Relegation takes place after the Second Stage and is determined using an aggregate table of the first two stages. As well as playing to win the championship and avoid relegation teams also compete for places in the following season's Copa Libertadores and Copa Sudamericana.

History
All football in Ecuador was played at amateur level until 1950 when the Guayas Football Association turned professional and held its first professional tournament for affiliated clubs (for clubs in Guayaquil). The Professional Football Championship of Guayaquil was first held in 1951 and was won by Río Guayas. In 1954, the football association in Pichincha (current the Asociación de Fútbol No Amatur de Pichincha [AFNA]) decided to turn professional and hold a professional tournament of their own for their affiliated clubs (for clubs in Quito & Ambato). The first Inter-Andean Professional Championship was held in 1954 and was won by LDU Quito.

The two tournaments were the top-level football leagues in Ecuador, but the champion of each could not claim to be the national champion. That changed in 1957 when a national football tournament was organized for the winners the two leagues. The first Ecuadorian Football Championship was contested between the champion and runner-up of the 1957 Campeonato Professional de Fútbol de Guayaquil of (Emelec & Barcelona, respectively) and the champion and runner-up of the 1957 Campeonato Professional Interandino (Deportivo Quito and Aucas, respectively). Emelec won the tournament and became the first national champions of football in Ecuador.

No championship was held in 1958 and 1959. The tournament returned in 1960 using the same format as in 1957. This time the field grew from four teams to eight teams. This format continued until 1967 when a number of changes occurred: 1) the regional tournaments were discontinued after the 1967 season; 2) teams contesting the national championship from 1968 onwards were now part of the Primera Categoría; and 3) a second level of Ecuadorian football (Segunda Categoría) was put into play and a system of relegation and promotion began in 1967.

In 1971, the Primera Categoría was divided into two Series: Serie A & Serie B. Serie A was to be the top level of club football, while Serie B was the second, and Segunda the third. Between, 1983–1988, Serie B was merged into the Segunda, but the Serie A continued. Serie B was brought back in 1989, and has stayed as the second level since.

In 2005, the Campeonato Ecuatoriano was divided into two tournaments to crown two champions in one year. The two tournaments were called Apertura and Clausura. The tournament returned to its year-long format in 2006.

Clubs
A total of 55 clubs have competed in the Serie A since the first season in 1957. Although Barcelona is the only club to have never been relegated, no club has ever played in every season. This anomaly is due to the fact that for the 1964 competition, teams from Guayaquil (including Barcelona and Emelec) declined to participate in the national championship.

The following sixteen clubs will compete in the Serie A during the 2022 season.

Champions by year
Barcelona has won 16 championships, followed by Emelec with 14 titles, El Nacional with 13, LDU Quito with 11 titles, Deportivo Quito with 5 titles, and Deportivo Cuenca, Olmedo, Delfin, Everest and Independiente del Valle with one title each. All the clubs that have won multiple titles have won back-to-back titles at least once. El Nacional and Emelec are the only two clubs to have won three titles in a row, El Nacional has done twice from 1976–1978 and 1982–1984, and C.S. Emelec from 2013-2015.

Titles by club

Titles by Province

All-time top goalscorers
Ecuadorian Ermen Benítez is the league's all-time top-scorer, having scored 191 goals over 15 season. He is also holds the record for scoring the most goals for one team. The top active goalscorer is Ebelio Ordóñez.

See also
Ecuadorian Football Federation
Ecuadorian football league system
Football in Ecuador
List of football clubs in Ecuador

References

External links
Official webpage 
Serie A on RSSSF

 
1
Ecuador

it:Campionato ecuadoriano di calcio